Orietta Mancia (born 29 October 1968) is a former Italian female long-distance runner and cross-country runner who competed at individual senior level at the World Athletics Cross Country Championships (1991, 1992, 1995).

Biography
Mancia won two national championships at individual senior level and was 5th in the final of 10,000 at the 1986 World Junior Championships.

Achievements

National titles
Italian Athletics Championships
10,000 m: 1990, 1992

References

External links
 
 Orietta Mancia at Association of Road Racing Statisticians

1968 births
Living people
Italian female long-distance runners
Italian female cross country runners
Athletes from Rome
Athletics competitors of Gruppo Sportivo Forestale